Events from the year 2000 in Belgium

Incumbents
Monarch: Albert II
Prime Minister: Guy Verhofstadt

Events
 10 June to 2 July – Belgium and the Netherlands jointly host the UEFA Euro 2000 football tournament, which is won by France.
 17 June – 174 fans from England are arrested in Brussels, following an affray with German fans ahead of an England v Germany match.
 6 August – 54th Spa 24 Hours held at Spa-Francorchamps
 9 September – 44th Gordon Bennett Cup held in Saint-Hubert.
 8 October – Provincial and municipal elections

Publications
 Francis Delpérée, Le droit constitutionnel de la Belgique (Brussels, Bruylant; Paris, L.G.D.J.).

Births
 25 January – Remco Evenepoel, cyclist
 26 March – Nina Derwael, gymnast
 29 December – Eliot Vassamillet, Eurovision singer
 15 June – Jérémie Makiese, Eurovision singer

Deaths
 23 May – Eddy Blondeel, 94, commander of the SAS during WWII
 9 November – Michel Demaret, 60, politician

See also
2000 in Belgian television

References

 
Belgium
Years of the 21st century in Belgium
2000s in Belgium
Belgium